Carolina Supply Company is a historic commercial building located at Greenville, South Carolina. It was built in 1914, and is a four-story, brick building in a utilitarian Renaissance Revival style. The building housed a textile and industrial supply company that supplied mills with equipment and supplies. The building now houses Wells Fargo Bank.

It was added to the National Register of Historic Places in 1997.

References

Commercial buildings on the National Register of Historic Places in South Carolina
Renaissance Revival architecture in South Carolina
Commercial buildings completed in 1914
National Register of Historic Places in Greenville, South Carolina